Tabaqa or Toubga is a town in Jabal al Gharbi District in Libya. It is just west of Gharbiya.

Notes

External links
 "Tabaqah Map — Satellite Images of Tabaqah" Maplandia World Gazetteer

Populated places in Jabal al Gharbi District
Tripolitania